South Lanarkshire is one of 32 unitary authorities of Scotland. It borders the south-east of the City of Glasgow and contains some of Greater Glasgow's suburban towns, as well as many rural towns and villages. It also shares borders with Dumfries and Galloway, East Ayrshire, East Renfrewshire, North Lanarkshire, the Scottish Borders and West Lothian. It includes most of the historic county of Lanarkshire.

Governance

South Lanarkshire is served by the South Lanarkshire Council. The council has its headquarters in Hamilton, has 16,000 employees, and a budget of almost £1bn.

Geography 
The large and varied geographical territory takes in rural and upland areas, market towns such as Lanark, Strathaven and Carluke, the urban burghs of Rutherglen, Cambuslang, and East Kilbride which was Scotland's first new town.

Principal settlements

Other settlements

Places of interest
Bothwell Castle
Calderglen Country Park, East Kilbride
Chatelherault Country Park, Hamilton, including Cadzow Castle
Clyde Valley
Craignethan Castle
David Livingstone Centre, Blantyre
Dollan Aqua Centre, East Kilbride
Falls of Clyde
Hamilton Mausoleum
James Hamilton Heritage Park, East Kilbride
John Hastie Museum, Strathaven
Lanark Loch
Little Sparta, near Dunsyre near Lanark
Low Parks Museum, Hamilton
New Lanark, a World Heritage Site
Rutherglen Town Hall and medieval church tower
Sites of the Battle of Drumclog and the Battle of Bothwell Bridge
Strathaven Castle
Wilsontown Ironworks

Tertiary education
South Lanarkshire College
University of the West of Scotland (formerly Bell College, University Of Paisley)

See also
List of Category A listed buildings in South Lanarkshire
Routes To Work South
Scheduled monuments in South Lanarkshire

References

External links 
South Lanarkshire Council homepage

 
Council areas of Scotland
Lanarkshire